Declan Power is a former Irish Army soldier, defence analyst and writer.

Power originally joined the Army Reserve (then FCÁ), before serving in a variety of roles in the Defence Forces. He later had a number of appointments in Ireland and abroad, including internal security, peacekeeping and anti-terrorism duties. He also attended the Military College and a number of other specialist Defence Force schools and courses.

Power's later years of service were spent attached to the Chief of Staff's Branch at Defence Forces Headquarters (DFHQ). He is a graduate of Dublin City University and Trinity College Dublin.

He wrote a book on the Siege of Jadotville, which was published in 2005 and adapted for film in 2015. He published a further book, titled Beyond the Call of Duty: Heroism in the Irish Defence Forces, in 2010.

As of 2013, Power was a contributing analyst on security and defence matters to a variety of institutions and media, including the Royal Irish Academy's Irish Studies in International Affairs (from the Congo to Mali, 2013).

References

External links
 

Year of birth missing (living people)
Living people
Irish military personnel
Alumni of Dublin City University
Alumni of Trinity College Dublin
Irish non-fiction writers
20th-century Irish people
21st-century Irish people